The Central Atlantic magmatic province (CAMP) is the Earth's largest continental large igneous province, covering an area of roughly 11 million km2. It is composed mainly of basalt that formed before Pangaea broke up in the Mesozoic Era, near the end of the Triassic and the beginning of the Jurassic periods. The subsequent breakup of Pangaea created the Atlantic Ocean, but the massive igneous upwelling provided a legacy of basaltic dikes, sills, and lavas now spread over a vast area around the present central North Atlantic Ocean, including large deposits in northwest Africa, southwest Europe, as well as northeast South America and southeast North America (found as continental tholeiitic basalts in subaerial flows and intrusive bodies). The name and CAMP acronym were proposed by Andrea Marzoli (Marzoli et al. 1999) and adopted at a symposium held at the 1999 Spring Meeting of the American Geophysical Union.

The CAMP volcanic eruptions occurred about 201 million years ago and split into four pulses lasting for over ~600,000 years. The resulting large igneous province is, in area covered, the most extensive on Earth. The volume of magma flow of between two and six million cubic kilometres makes it one of the most voluminous as well.

This geologic event is associated with the Triassic–Jurassic extinction event.

Connected magma flows 
Although some connections among these basalts had long been recognized, in 1988 they were linked as constituting a single major flood basalt province. The basaltic sills of similar age (near 200 Ma, or earliest Jurassic) and composition (intermediate-Ti quartz tholeiite) which occur across the vast Amazon River basin of Brazil were linked to the province in 1999. Remnants of CAMP have been identified on four continents (Africa, Europe, North America and South America) and consist of thoeliitic basalts formed during the opening of the Atlantic Ocean basin during the breakup of the Pangean supercontinent.

Geographical extent 

Nearly all CAMP rocks are tholeiitic in composition, with widely separated areas where basalt flows are preserved, as well as large groups of diabase (dolerite) sills or sheets, small lopoliths, and dikes throughout the province. Dikes occur in very large individual swarms with particular compositions and orientations. CAMP activity is apparently related to the rifting and breakup of Pangaea during the Late Triassic through Early Jurassic periods, and the enormous province size, varieties of basalt, and brief time span of CAMP magmatism invite speculation about mantle processes that could produce such a magmatic event as well as rift a supercontinent.

Connection with the Triassic-Jurassic boundary and the associated mass extinction event 
In 2013 the CAMP's connection to the end-Triassic extinction, with major extinctions that enabled dinosaur domination of land, became more firmly established. Until 2013, the uncertainties in the geochronologic dates had been too coarse to confirm that the volcanic eruptions were correlated with major climate changes. The work by Blackburn et al. demonstrated a tight synchroneity between the earliest volcanism and extinction of large populations using zircon uranium-lead (U-Pb) dating. They further demonstrated that the magmatic eruptions as well as the accompanying atmospheric changes were split into four pulses lasting for over ~600,000 years.

Before that integration, two hypotheses were in debate. One hypothesis was based especially on studies on Triassic-Jurassic basins from Morocco where CAMP lava flows are outcropping, whereas the other was based on end-Triassic extinction data from eastern North American basins and lava flows showing an extremely large turnover in fossil pollen, spores (sporomorphs), and vertebrates, respectively.

Morocco 

The thickest lava flow sequences of the African CAMP are in Morocco, where there are basaltic lava piles more than 300 metres thick. The most-studied area is Central High Atlas, where the best preserved and most complete basaltic lava piles are exposed. According to geochemical, petrographic and isotopic data four distinct tholeiitic basaltic units were recognized and can be placed throughout the Central High Atlas: Lower, Intermediate, Upper and Recurrent basalts.

The Lower and Intermediate units are constituted by basaltic andesites, whereas the Upper and Recurrent units have basaltic composition. From Lower to Recurrent unit, we observe: 
a progressive decrease of eruption rate (the Lower and the Intermediate units represent over 80% of preserved lava volume);
a trend going from intersertal to porphyritic texture;
a progressive depletion of incompatible element contents in the basalts, possibly linked to a progressive depletion of their mantle source.

Isotopic analyses 
Ages were determined by 40Ar/39Ar analysis on plagioclase. These data show indistinguishable ages (199.5±0.5 Ma) from Lower to Upper lava flows, from central to northern Morocco. Therefore, CAMP was an intense, short magmatic event. Basalts of the Recurrent unit are slightly younger (mean age: 197±1 Ma) and represent a late event. Consistently, the Upper and Recurrent basalts are separated by  a sedimentary layer that locally reaches a thickness of circa 80 m.

Magnetostratigraphy 
According to magnetostratigraphic data, the Moroccan CAMP events were divided into five groups, differing in paleomagnetic orientations (declination and inclination). Each group is composed by a smaller number of lava flows (i.e., a lower volume) than the preceding one. 
These data suggest that they were created by five short magma pulses and eruption events, each one possibly <400 (?) years long. 
All lava flow sequences are characterized by normal polarity, except for a brief paleomagnetic reversal yielded by one lava flow and by a localized interlayered limestone in two distinct section of the High Atlas CAMP.

Palynological analyses 
Palynological data from sedimentary layers samples at the base of four lava flow sequences constrain the onset of the CAMP, since there is no evidence of depositional hiatus or tectonic deformation at the bottom of the lava flow piles . The palynological assemblage observed in these basal layers is typical of Late Triassic age, similar to that of the uppermost Triassic sedimentary rocks of eastern North America.
Samples from interlayered limestone in lava flows provided unreliable palynological data. One limestone bed from the top to the central High Atlas upper basalts yielded a Late Triassic palynological assemblage. However, the observed sporomorphs in this sample are rare and poorly preserved.

Conclusions 
All of these data indicate that the basaltic lava flows of the Central Atlantic magmatic province in Morocco were erupted at c. 200 Ma and spanned the Tr-J boundary. Thus, it is very possible that there is a connection between this magmatic event and the Tr-J boundary climatic and biotic crisis that led to the mass-extinction.

Eastern North America 

The North American portion of the CAMP lava flows crop out in various sections in the basins of Newark, Culpeper, Hartford, Deerfield, i.e. the Newark Supergroup in New England (USA), and in the Fundy Basin in Nova Scotia (Canada). The CAMP is here constituted by rare olivine- and common quartz-normative basalts showing a great lateral extension and a maximum thickness up to 1 km. The basaltic flows occur on top of continental fluvial and lacustrine sedimentary units of Triassic age. 40Ar/39Ar data (on plagioclase) indicate for these basaltic units an absolute age of 198-200 Ma bringing this magmatic event undoubtedly close to the Triassic-Jurassic (Tr-J) boundary. Thus it is necessary to determine whether it straddles the boundary or not: if not, then the CAMP could not be a cause of the Late Triassic extinction event. For example, according to  there are palynological, geochemical, and magnetostratigraphic evidences that the CAMP postdates the Tr-J boundary.

Magnetostratigraphy 
In the Newark Basin, a magnetic reversal (E23r) is observed just below the oldest basalts and more or less in the same position as a palynologic turnover, interpreted as the Tr-J boundary. In Morocco, two reversals have been detected in two lava flow sequences. Two distinct correlations between the Moroccan and the Newark magnetostratigraphy have been proposed.   suggest that the Tr-J boundary is located above the lower reverse polarity level which is positioned more or less at the base of the Intermediate basalt unit of Morocco. These two levels can be correlated with chron E23r of the Newark Basin, therefore the North American CAMP Basalts postdate the Tr–J boundary whereas part of the Moroccan CAMP was erupted within the Triassic. Contrarily,  propose that these two levels could be earliest Jurassic intervals of reverse polarity not sampled in the Newark Basin Sequence (many more lava flows are present in the Moroccan Succession than in the Newark Basin), but observed in Early Jurassic sedimentary sequences of the Paris Basin of France. Reverse polarity intervals in America could be present within North Mountain (Fundy basin, Nova Scotia) which are poorly sampled even if previous magnetostratigraphy analysis in this sequence showed only normal polarity, or in the Scots Bay Member of the Fundy basin which have never been sampled. There is only one outcrop in the CAMP of America where reverse polarity is observable: a CAMP–related (about 200 Ma) dike in North Carolina.  suggest that reverse polarity intervals in this dike could be of post Triassic age and correlated with the same events in Morocco.

Palynological analyses 
The Tr-J boundary is not officially defined, but most workers recognise it in continental strata by the last appearance of index taxa such as Ovalipollis ovalis, Vallasporites ignatii and Patinasporites densus or, in marine sections, by the first appearance of the ammonite Psiloceras planorbis. In the Newark basin the palynological turnover event (hence the Tr-J boundary mass extinction) occurs below the oldest CAMP lava flows. The same can be said for the Fundy, Hartford and Deerfield Basins. In the investigated Moroccan CAMP sections (Central High Atlas Basin), sedimentary layers sampled immediately below the oldest basaltic lava flows, apparently contain Triassic taxa (e.g., P. densus), and were thus defined as Triassic in age as at least the lowest lava flows . Still, a different interpretation is suggested by : the sampled sedimentary strata are quite deformed and this can mean that some sedimentary units could be lacking (eroded or structurally omitted). With respect to the Triassic pollens found in some sedimentary units above the Upper Unit basalts, they could have been reworked, so they don’t represent a completely reliable constraint.

Geochemical analyses 
CAMP lava flows of North America can be geochemically separated in three units: the older ones are classified as high titanium quartz normative (HTQ) basalts (TiO2 = 1.0-1.3 wt%); these are followed by lava flows classified as low titanium quartz normative (LTQ) basalts (TiO2 = ca. 0.8-1.3 wt%); and then by the youngest lava flow unit classified as high titanium iron quartz normative (HTIQ) basalts (TiO2 = 1.4-1.6 wt%).

Therefore, according to these data, CAMP basalts shouldn’t be included among the direct causes of the Tr-J mass extinction.

References

Bibliography

External links 
 The CAMP website
 Map of a small portion of the province

Large igneous provinces
Jurassic volcanism
Triassic–Jurassic extinction event
Plate tectonics
Igneous petrology